Höfðavatn is a lagoon-like lake in northern Iceland. It is located in the municipality of Skagafjörður.

Geography
Höfðavatn lies at the fjord of Skagafjörður about 7 km north of the village of Hofsós.

The surface of the Höfðavatn is about 10 km2; the maximum depth is 6.4 m, the middle depth 3.9 M. North of the lake lies the Málmeyjarsund , west of Þórðarhöfði .

References

Lakes of Iceland